Stephen Sewell may refer to:
Stephen Sewell (lawyer) (1770–1832), early Canadian lawyer and politician
Stephen Sewell (writer) (born 1953), Australian screen and play writer

See also
Stephen Sewall (disambiguation)
Steve Sewell (born 1963), former American football player